Lake Arhuaycocha is a lake in Peru, in the Ancash Region, Huaylas Province, Santa Cruz District. It is at the foot of the mountains Pucajirca and Rinrijirca and the Arhuay glacier.

References 

Lakes of Peru
Lakes of Ancash Region